Rendille may refer to:
the Rendille people
the Rendille language